The Anglican Church of St Mary in Wambrook, Somerset, England, was built in the 13th century. It is a Grade II* listed building.

History

The church was built in the 13th century and has been altered many times since. In the 15th century the nave was rebuilt. Much later, in 1812, most of the chancel was reconstructed. A further Restoration was carried out in 1892. In 1963 the old south porch was transformed into a chapel.

The parish is part of the benefice of Chard St. Mary along with Combe St Nicholas and Wambrook. This benefice is within the Diocese of Bath and Wells. Previously, the parish was part of the Diocese of Salisbury.

Architecture

The stone building has hamstone dressings and a slate roof. It has a three-bay nave and chancel. The three-stage tower is supported by setback buttresses. The tower contains a peal of five bells.

Inside, the church has a 13th-century font. Also, there is a west gallery held up by cast-iron columns.

The churchyard contains a set of 17th-century stocks.

See also  
 List of ecclesiastical parishes in the Diocese of Bath and Wells

References

External links

 Wambrook Parish Church

Grade II* listed buildings in South Somerset
Wambrook, Saint Mary
Wambrook, Saint Mary